Bratz (also known as Bratz: The Series) is an American CGI animated series based on the toy dolls of the same name. Produced by Mike Young Productions and MGA Entertainment, it aired on Fox's 4Kids TV from September 10, 2005 to October 14, 2006. In 2008, after a hiatus, it was renewed for season 2. It focuses on four female teens who run their own magazine. In 2021, a web series titled "Talkin' Bratz" that featured a similar CGI animation style to the original series, aired on the official Bratz TikTok page. Set in the same world as the original series, it saw cast members Olivia Hack and Ogie Banks reprise their roles as Cloe and Dylan, respectively. The voice actresses are an all-star cast featuring Hack, Soleil Moon Frye, Tia Mowry, Dionne Quan, Wendie Malick, Lacey Chabert, and Kaley Cuoco. From 2018-2020, the series' episodes were uploaded to the Bratz YouTube channel.

Every different voice actress/voice actor is featured for both seasons, including season 2, where the show replaced the cast with Canadian voice actresses consisting of Britt McKillip, Britt Irvin, Dorla Bell, Maryke Hendrikse, Ellie Harvie, Kelly Sheridan, and Ashleigh Ball.

The show had produced films based on the series line of dolls, and spawned video games based its series. Some of the series include spin-offs, like Bratz Babyz, Bratz Kidz or the Bratz in their original style. Others include Bratzillaz and Bratz: C.I.Y. Shoppe Webseries, which included different plots to serve as reboots.

Set in the fictional city of Stilesville, the show revolves around four teenagers (Cloe, Jade, Sasha, Yasmin) running their own teen magazine, titled "Bratz", while struggling life at Stiles High School. Their rival magazine is "Your Thing", owned and run by the proud and demanding self-proclaimed "Reigning Queen of Fashion" Burdine Maxwell, and her mean identical twin interns Kirstee and Kaycee, known infamously as "the Tweevils". Accompanied by their friends Dylan, Cameron and Eitan, the girls' issues are exploited throughout the series, both in and outside of Stilesville.

Characters

Main characters

Bratz Magazine

Cloe

Cloe (Angel) (voiced by Olivia Hack in season 1; Britt McKillip in season 2): Cloe is in charge of the "Dear Cloe" column in the magazine, where readers write to her for teen advice. She is characterized by her romantic, dreamy and outgoing attitude, as well as her highly dramatic tendencies, hence specializing in acting and debating. Although she enjoys shopping and fashion, she plays in a tomboy side through skateboarding and riding a motorcycle. Her love interest is Cameron.

Sasha

Sasha (Bunny Boo) (voiced by Tia Mowry in season 1; Dorla Bell in season 2): Sasha is the music editor of the group and specializes in hip-hop dancing and creating songs. She is described by her bold and sassy attitude, although this can sometimes backfire and make her become with perfectionism and controlling. Her catchphrase is "Let's move people". Like Cloe, she can be a tomboy sometimes, which is reflected in her fashion of dressing.

Jade

Jade (Kool Kat) (voiced by Soleil Moon Frye in season 1; Britt Irvin in season 2): Jade is the fashion editor of the group with a bubbly, open and sensitive personality. After she gets unreasonably fired from an internship at "Your Thing" magazine by Burdine, the girls decided to make their own magazine.

Yasmin

Yasmin (Pretty Princess) (voiced by Dionne Quan in season 1; Maryke Hendrikse in season 2): Yasmin is the main journalist for the magazine due to her passion for literature. Known for her sensitive, sweet and intelligent personality, she has a strong philanthropic side, owning her own animal shelter. Her love interest is Eitan.

Your Thing Magazine

Burdine Maxwell

Burdine Maxwell (voiced by Wendie Malick in season 1; Ellie Harvie in season 2): Burdine is the head of "Your Thing" magazine. She is, in reality, unintentionally responsible for the creation of Bratz magazine after firing Jade unreasonably during the latter's internship. Quick to anger, impatient and bossy, she proclaims herself the "Reigning Queen of Fashion", choosing to uphold this title by dressing constantly in same pink suits and owning over 50 pairs of old-fashioned pink pumps. Her catchphrase is: "Mother of Pink!" and "Chop chop!" She dotes on her dog miniature pinscher Royale and has an almost identical-looking twin sister named Burnice.

Kirstee

Kirstee (voiced by Kaley Cuoco in season 1; Ashleigh Ball in season 2): Kirstee the oldest of the Tweevils who does her bun with a crown-shaped hair tie. Due to being older and more intelligent she tends to lead and facilitate the twins' various operations.

Kaycee

Kaycee (voiced by Lacey Chabert in season 1; Kelly Sheridan in season 2): Kaycee is the youngest of the Tweevils who does her bun with a ribbon-shaped hair tie and has an adhesive bandage on her nose which, according to Sasha, was the result for three times of rhinoplasty following accidents involving it. Her catchphrase is: "Oww! My nose!" She tends to be less intelligent and has a higher voice than her sister.

Supporting characters

Cameron

Cameron (The Blaze) (voiced by Charlie Schlatter in season 1; Ian James Corlett in season 2): Cameron, often nicknamed as "Cam", is a good friend to the Bratz and has a passion for motorcycles. He's in love with Cloe and is her main love interest.

Dylan

Dylan (The Fox) (voiced by Ogie Banks in season 1; Adrian Holmes in season 2): Dylan, often nicknamed as "Dyl-Man", is another boy who has a habit of annoying the Bratz, usually resulting them in saying "Goodbye Dylan!". Although he is flirtatious and outgoing, he has a heart of gold and is there for the Bratz whenever they need him. His love interest is Sasha.

Eitan

Eitan (The Dragon) (voiced by Josh Keaton in season 1; Trevor Devall in season 2): Eitan is a boy who works at a smoothie bar in the mall area of Stilesville. He does not appear as often as either Cameron or Dylan do. He is in love with Yasmin and in one episode ("Crush in a Rush"), Eitan agreed to ask Yasmin out on a date while in turn, the others would make a magazine article based on it. However, Yasmin learns this from the Tweevils and rejects Eitan in anger, although they later reconcile near the episode's end.

Byron Powell

Byron Powell (voiced by Greg Ellis in season 1; Alistair Abell in season 2): Byron is a man from London whom the Bratz (along with Cameron and Dylan) first met in Bratz: Rock Angelz. He lives the double life of being a reality TV show host and a secret agent at the same time, and recruits the Bratz for some of his missions. He appears to be a parody of Simon Cowell (American Idol).

Aloncé

Aloncé (voiced by Cree Summer and singing vocals by Lauren Evans): Aloncé is an R&B singer who is Sasha's favorite musician. A parody of Beyoncé, she only appears in "Sasha's Big Interview" and cutscenes of the video game Bratz: The Movie and she was mentioned in the episode "Not So Hot For Teacher". Her hit singles are "Everything", "My Attitude", and "Shining Like Real Diamondz". According to Sasha and Jade, she has a moon tattoo on the back of her hand, two albums that went platinum and a Grammy Award.

Episodes

Reception
Common Sense Media gave the show a 1 star rating, saying that the show might be a bad influence towards young girls and that "Bratz are the modern-day Barbie dolls whose vampy appearance has upset many parents seeking healthy role models for their daughters."

Ratings
The first season had very good ratings, however the second season had low ratings, which led to the show's cancellation in 2008.

References

External links
 

Bratz
2000s American animated television series
2000s American high school television series
2005 American television series debuts
2008 American television series endings
American children's animated comedy television series
Fashion-themed television series
American children's animated musical television series
American computer-animated television series
Anime-influenced Western animated television series
English-language television shows
Teen animated television series
Television series by Lionsgate Television
Television series by Splash Entertainment
Television shows based on toys
Television series based on fashion dolls
2000s comedy-drama television series